Mudzenchoot Provincial Park is a provincial park in British Columbia, Canada, located 90km northwest of Fort St. James in the Omineca Country of that province's Central Interior. It is in a high elevation area characterized by dry meadows featuring unique vegetation types including cotton grass, erigerons, and aster type species. The park has no facilities nor road access points.

References
BC Parks webpage

External links

Provincial parks of British Columbia
Regional District of Bulkley-Nechako
Omineca Country
2001 establishments in British Columbia
Protected areas established in 2001